Two ships of the Royal Navy have borne the name HMS Solent, after the Solent, a stretch of water between the Isle of Wight and mainland England:

 , a War Department submarine mining vessel Solent, built in 1885, transferred to the Navy as a storeship in 1907, and sold later that year
  was an S-class submarine, launched in 1944 and broken up in 1961

See also
List of ships named Solent

References

Royal Navy ship names